The terms Muisca religion and mythology refer to the pre-Columbian beliefs of the Muisca indigenous people of the Cordillera Oriental highlands of the Andes in the vicinity of Bogotá, Colombia. The tradition includes a selection of received myths concerning the origin and organization of the universe. Their belief system may be described as a polytheistic religion containing a very strong element of spirituality based on an epistemology of mysticism.

Muisca religion

Creation of the universe 
Bachué ("the Grandmother") is a non-material principle of creation, the will, the thought and the imagination of all  the things to come. She is a similar concept  to the principle of tao in the Chinese mythology.

The time of unquyquie nxie ("the first thought") is the time of the cosmic origin, when the thoughts of Bague became actions. This is the time when Bague created the builders of the universe and ordered them to create.

Beginning of the world 
The world started with Chimi ("the pulp"), the first material object in the world. Then, in the inners of tomsa, were incubated the embryos of stars, embryos of land and embryos of stone. When tomsa was full, the seeds of the earth emerged and the remains were thrown away, forming the Milky Way.

The elements were distributed to the deities: the heat to Sué – the sun, the cold to Chía – the Moon, and the clouds and smoke to the Earth, but all the things were still seeds and nothing was germinated. Then, Mnya, gold, energy, was united with Chimi, the pulp, and became Chímini, the creative force, which caused the germination of the seeds of all things.

Origin of mankind 
According to Muisca legends, mankind was originated in Lake Iguaque, when grandmother goddess Bachué came out from the lake with a boy in her arms. When the boy grew, they populated the earth. They are considered the ancestors of the human race. finally, they disappeared unto the lake in the shape of snakes.

Great flood 
Due to transgressions against the divine laws, Chibchacum brought forth a flood that covered the world and nearly destroyed the human race. Then, the protective god Bochica drove away the waters through the Tequendama Falls, and taught humans the basis of civilization, agriculture, religion, the arts, and crafts. When he was about to leave to his heavenly kingdom, Cuchavira (the rainbow) appeared and Bochica announced his second coming, far away in the future, in an event marked by death and disease. These events are similar to the biblical histories of Genesis and Apocalypse.

Deities 
The first gods, constructors of the universe, built the first cuca or ceremonial temple. They were:
 Bachué ("The one with the naked breasts"): the mother goddess who raised from the underworld to give birth to the human race
 Bochica ("The father of civilization") also called Nemqueteba, Nemquereteba, Sadigua, Chimizapagua
 Chía: the Moon goddess of the Muisca
 Chibchacum ("The one who holds the earth"): the universal legislator
 Chiminigagua: trinity deity, constituted by  Chí, Chímini and Chiminigagua
 Cuchavira: god of the rainbow
 Cuza ("The one who is like the night"): the male principle of creation
 Huitaca: rebelling goddess of sexual liberation
 Nencatacoa ("The protector of festivities, beer, and the arts")

The gods danced a very long dance (sas quyhynuca), with the music of the fo drum, in the first ceremony. This ceremony gave origin to space and time.

Then, the gods created the first materials of the universe: fiva (the air),  faova (the cosmic cloud) and ie (the smoke). Then, they created the six directions of the material dimension, and in the middle of itugue, the emptiness, they created the centre of power tomsa (bellybutton of the universe). But, still the universe had no consistence, and they waited many bxogonoas aeons until the sas bequia, the beginning of the world.

See also 
El Dorado, a legend that grew out of a Muisca ritual
Lake Iguaque, a lake involved in creation, in the mythology of the Muisca
Lake Guatavita, a sacred ceremonial lake of the Muisca
Guarani mythology

References 

 
Muisca
Muisca